The Flag of Hazaristan (Persian : پرچم هزارستان ) is known as the national flag of the Hazara people. It includes three colors: yellow, white and blue. It was originally proposed and presented on the cover of the anthology Poems for the Hazara.  Article 37 of the Hazaristan Charter, released by the Pioneers of the Hazaristan Independence Movement on April 11, 2021, is about the Hazaristan Flag. 

The flag of Hazaristan has been extensively used in many countries during the global Hazara protests against the Hazara genocide in Afghanistan. 

    The flag of Hazaristan also has been used by well-known Hazara organizations such as the Hazara National Congress, the Munich Hazara Association, Brisbane’s Hazara Community, and the Hazara Council of Great Britain.

Hazaristan, a mountainous region in central Afghanistan, in the Hindu Kush mountain range. Hazaristan is not an independent country, but has been home to the Hazara people since antiquity, first referenced by extant literature in Baburnama, the  bi-lingual memoirs of Mughal Emperor Babur (in Persian and Chagatai Turkic)

Design
The color combination of the flag symbolizes the Hazara people's roots and origin, sky, their loyalty, long winter in Hazaristan, their future and development.

History
The Flag of Hazaristan was designed by the Hazara poet and activist Kamran Mir Hazar.

References

Hazara history
Flags of country subdivisions
Hazarajat
Hazaristan
Hazaristan
Hazaristan